Chan Chan Airport ,  is an airstrip serving Choshuenco, a small lakeshore town in Los Ríos Region of Chile.

The airstrip is at the foot of the Mocho-Choshuenco volcano, in the narrow valley of the Enco River. The volcano begins rising immediately to the east of the runway. There is mountainous terrain in all quadrants.

See also

Transport in Chile
List of airports in Chile

References

External links
OpenStreetMap - Chan Chan
OurAirports - Chan Chan
FallingRain - Chan Chan Airport

Airports in Los Ríos Region